Wendy Strehlow ( 1958) is an Australian actress, particularly in soap opera and theatre, she has appeared in numerous TV series and tele-dramas but is probably best known for her role as the much loved nurse sister Judy Loveday in the television soap opera A Country Practice, from 1981 to 1986 (217 episodes), for which she won a Logie Award for Best Supporting Actress in 1985. From mid-2005 to 2008, she played the role of Paramedic Lorraine Tanner in the Seven Network medical drama All Saints.

Television and theatre roles 
Other TV credits include: E Street, Blue Heelers, McLeod's Daughters, Home and Away, A Step in the Right Direction and The Saddle Club.
 
She has appeared in numerous stage productions including, The Greening of Grace, Henry IV, The Memory of Water, Travesties and the pulitzer prize winning production, Clybourne Park.

Personal life
Strehlow is originally from the city of Rockhampton, Queensland. She took ballet lessons and joined Rockhampton Little Theatre at age 11, before studying drama at Flinders University in South Australia. She is married to a television sound technician. Her parents were both farmers who ran a bakery, and she is the mother of soap actress Sophie Hensser.

Filmography

FILM

TELEVISION

References

External links
 
 Holding the Mirror Up to Wendy - Interview with Wendy Strehlow (2014)

20th-century Australian actresses
Australian stage actresses
Australian television actresses
Living people
Logie Award winners
1958 births
21st-century Australian actresses